Navia brachyphylla is a species of plant in the genus Navia. This species is endemic to Venezuela.

References

brachyphylla
Flora of Venezuela